The following article is a broad timeline of the course of events surrounding the attack on the United States Capitol on January 6, 2021, by rioters supporting United States President Donald Trump's attempts to overturn his defeat in the 2020 presidential election. Pro-Trump rioters stormed the United States Capitol after assembling on the Ellipse of the Capitol complex for a rally headlined as the "Save America March".

At the rally, Donald Trump Jr., Rudy Giuliani, and several Republican members of Congress addressed the crowd and repeated Donald Trump's false claims that electoral fraud affected the 2020 election outcome. In his hour-long speech, President Trump suggested marching towards the Capitol, assuring his audience he would be with them, to demand that Congress "only count the electors who have been lawfully slated", and "patriotically make your voices heard". Towards his conclusion, he said "we fight. We fight like hell. And if you don't fight like hell, you're not going to have a country anymore."

The demonstrations turned violent with attendees breaching multiple police perimeters; assaulting Capitol police officers; and occupying, vandalizing, and ransacking parts of the building for several hours. Four people died that day: rioter Ashli Babbitt was fatally shot by a Capitol Police officer; two died of heart conditions; another died of an amphetamine intoxication. The next day, Capitol Police officer Brian Sicknick died after suffering two strokes, having been physically attacked and pepper sprayed during the riot.

All times are specified or approximated in Eastern Time, or UTC-5:00.

Important trials and fact finding is still ongoing (e.g. https://www.politico.com/news/2023/03/09/classified-info-proud-boys-trial-00086357) bringing previous narratives into question.

Preceding events

2020 Jul-Oct
 July 30: Trump casts skepticism on mail-in ballots at a press briefing. "I don't want to see [a term like 'projected winner']...a week after November 3rd or a month or, frankly, with litigation and everything else that can happen, years. Years. Or you never even know who won the election," he says. He adds: "I want an election and a result much, much more than you."
 September 29: During a Presidential debate, Trump orders members of the Proud Boys to "stand back and stand by." This direction by the President is well-received by the Proud Boys, and white nationalist men begin to join in record numbers. This will eventually lead to membership in the organization tripling by January 6.
 October 31: Steve Bannon explains to associates that Trump has a "strategy": "What Trump's gonna do is just declare victory. Right? He's gonna declare victory. But that doesn't mean he's a winner. He's just gonna 'say' he's a winner."

2020 Nov 

 November 3: Election Day.
 November 4: Trump addresses supporters at the White House and references the ballots still remaining to be counted, saying "A very sad group of people is trying to disenfranchise [those voters who voted for me] and we won't stand for it ... We'll be going to the US Supreme Court; we want all voting to stop. We don't want them to find any ballots at 4 in the morning, and add them to the list ... We were getting ready to win this election. Frankly, we did win this election," following the plan laid out by Bannon on October 31.
 November 7: The Associated Press, Fox News, and the other major networks call Pennsylvania for Biden, thus putting him above the required 270 electoral votes to be named President-elect.
 November 9:
 Trump fires Secretary of Defense Mark Esper and replaces him with Christopher C. Miller as acting Secretary.  In response to the firings, CIA Director Gina Haspel privately tells Chair of the Joint Chiefs Milley that "we are on the way to a right-wing coup".
 Oath Keepers member Jessica Watkins sends text messages inviting people to the Oath Keepers' basic training in Ohio. One message says, "I need you fighting fit by innaugeration."
 November 14: Over 10,000 people gather in Freedom Plaza for the Million MAGA March in support of Trump's election fraud claims. Speakers include Alex Jones and Representative Marjorie Taylor Greene. Trump circles Freedom Plaza in his motorcade. Proud Boys, Oath Keepers, and Three Percenters are in attendance. Proud Boys skirmish with counter-protesters throughout the day. At least 20 people are arrested and two D.C. police officers are injured. That evening, Trump praises his supporters who fought with counter-protesters. Near midnight, a massive "TRUMP LAW AND ORDER" banner is laid atop Black Lives Matter Plaza, then moved close to the White House.
 November 15-16: This appears to be the first warning to a government official about January 6th.  Harvard Law professor Emeritus, Laurence Tribe, received an email from a former student in Ukraine who uncovered an operation by Russian intelligence to lend support to what two months later came to be known as "January 6th" (the email henceforth is called "The Tribe Dossier"). The Dossier noted the Kremlin's operation aimed to penetrate and salt the fields of conservative social media and to stir-up an imminent violent uprising through a Russian data-gathering and data-exploitation operation. Specifically, the Dossier described “the Kremlin’s penetration of U.S. civil society and government affairs,” and noted the Kremlin appeared to have obtained "IDs [personal identifying details], phone numbers, [and] email addresses"    of American citizens for that purpose. The Dossier further stated that the Kremlin's purpose was to "manipulate U.S. elections" by "foment[ing] confusion, chaos, acts of terror, or violent / armed civil unrest"    (the description of what came to be known as the "insurrection" portion "January 6th"). The author of the Dossier (Tribe's former student) asked Tribe to “forward it [his intelligence assessment] to whomever in the government that might follow through" because "the risks are huge." Tribe's student noted that the Department of State in Ukraine — under both Republican and Democratic administrations — had not been employing best practices and that he could no longer wait for the State Department or FBI to help coordinate a response and was worried about the spoiling of actionable intelligence. The Dossier also correctly identified suspects that the FBI later arrested after January 6th. The author of the Dossier noted that his investigation did not yield pro or anti Trump conclusions, but rather focused on the Kremlin working feverishly to lay the groundwork for January 6th. After January 6th the author of the Dossier noted Russia uses this method because, "The Kremlin does not have conventional forces in the U.S., so they have to use duplicitous means to convince people to act in ways that serve the Kremlin’s interests. The common, and not politically-correct, term for such people is ‘useful idiots.’"   
 November 16: In an internal communication with a Fox News producer, Tucker Carlson said he didn't believe the election fraud claims as presented by Sidney Powell and Rudy Giuliani. "Sidney Powell is lying,” Carlson said, calling her “dangerous as hell" and "a complete nut. No one will work with her. Ditto with Rudy." Three days later, he wrote in an article that "we took Sidney Powell seriously... We've always respected her work and we simply wanted to see the details. ... So we invited Sidney Powell on the show. ... But she never sent us any evidence... When we checked with others around the Trump campaign ... they also told us Powell had never given them any evidence... We are certainly hopeful that she will [provide it]." He added that "this country will not be united" until everyone agreed on whether fraud had occurred.
 November 21: Women for America First files a permit application for a rally at the Lincoln Memorial on December 12. The group's original application for a rally in Freedom Plaza was denied because of inauguration preparations.

2020 Dec 
 December 1: U.S. attorney general Bill Barr says, in an interview published on this day by the Associated Press, that there is no evidence of election fraud on a scale that would change the election outcome. When Trump hears that Barr has publicly contradicted him, he is so angry that he throws his lunch at the wall, according to a White House aide's testimony to the January 6 house committee on June 28, 2022.
 December 2: Facebook disbands its Civic Integrity team, including the Group Task Force, after employees' vocal internal complaints about lack of action leaked and caused embarrassment. This slows enforcement against Facebook Groups and users spreading election misinformation and calling for political violence. The company also drops other emergency measures put in place for the election season.
 December 7: The Arizona Republican Party asks supporters whether they are willing to give their lives fighting over the election results.
 December 8: 
 Trump campaign lawyer Jack Wilenchik emailed Trump campaign strategist Boris Epshteyn to explain the fake electors scheme. Wilenchik wrote: "We would just be sending in 'fake' electoral votes to Pence so that 'someone' in Congress can make an objection when they start counting votes, and start arguing that the 'fake' votes should be counted." Wilenchik helped organize the fake electors from Arizona. In a later email, adding a smiley face emoji, Wilenchik acknowledged that the term "alternative" sounded better than "fake."
 General Michael Flynn receives a presidential pardon.  He would later participate in the D.C. events on January 5.
 December 12:
 Proud Boys march through Freedom Plaza in Washington, D.C., in advance of the pro-Trump rally scheduled later in the day.
 Pro-Trump rallies in Washington, D.C., attract thousands of Trump supporters protesting the election results, including numerous Proud Boys. Speakers include Michael Flynn, Sebastian Gorka, Alex Jones, podcaster David Harris Jr., Nick Fuentes, Mike Lindell and Oath Keeper's leader Stewart Rhodes. Jones says, "Joe Biden is a globalist, and Joe Biden will be removed one way or another."  Harris says that if there were a civil war, "we're the ones with all the guns." Fuentes gets the crowd to chant, "Destroy the GOP! Destroy the GOP!" Flynn tells the crowd that he is certain that Trump will be the next President. Rhodes calls on Trump to invoke the Insurrection Act, and warns that not doing so would lead to a "much more bloody war." Trump flies over the crowd several times in Marine One and tweets his appreciation for their support.
 Violent clashes throughout the day between Proud Boys and counter-protesters lead to 33 arrests, including for assault on a police officer. That night, Proud Boy members vandalize four churches and burn a Black Lives Matter banner.
 December 14:
 Biden wins the Electoral College vote.
 Trump electors for Arizona, Georgia, Michigan, Nevada, Pennsylvania, and Wisconsin, all of which Biden won in the election, cast purported electoral votes for Trump. The "votes" cast by the pro-Trump "alternate electors" have no legal standing. The pro-Trump groups in five states sent their fake electoral votes to the National Archives, but the National Archives did not forward these to Congress, because under the Electoral Count Act, only slates certified by the states are forward to Congress.
 One America News releases a video about Trump's reelection efforts with a voiceover stating, "Supporters of President Trump are continuing to fight for four more years, storming the nation's capital to participate in dueling rallies."
 Resignation of Attorney General William Barr is publicly announced.
 December 16: The national council of "The Three Percenters – Original" group, one of the largest Three Percenter militias, issues a statement alleging that "there was widespread fraud perpetrated against the American people." The statement continues, 
 A luncheon at Trump International Hotel results in draft Executive Order.  The order would direct the Secretary of Defense to immediately seize voting machines and would establish Sidney Powell as a "Special Counsel" empowered to "to oversee this operation and institute all criminal and civil proceedings ".
 December 17: Rep. Paul Gosar claims that Trump won Arizona because of the alleged data theft of 700,000 votes.
 December 18–19:
 Unscheduled meeting between Sidney Powell, Michael Flynn, and Patrick Byrne ("outside group"), and Trump. Upon learning of the meeting, White House Counsel Pat Cipollone immediately joined the meeting. Eric Herschmann said the outside group suggested that Venezuela had meddled in the election. The meeting shifts to Yellow Oval breaking up after midnight. Mark Meadows escorts Giuliani so he won't "wander back into the mansion".
 1:42 AM - Trump announces the January 6 rally on Twitter, stating:
Statistically impossible to have lost the 2020 Election. Big protest in D.C. on January 6th. Be there, will be wild!
 December 19:  Speaking at a rally in Arizona, Ali Alexander appears to advocate for violence against Republican members of Congress who do not fight to overturn the election results.
 December 20: 
 The domain name wildprotest.com is registered to host a website advertising a protest near the Capitol building from 10 am to 5 pm on January 6.
 Congresswoman-elect Marjorie Taylor Greene text-messages U.S. Senator Kelly Loeffler, inviting her to a White House meeting with Trump and members of Congress who plan to "challenge the Electoral College votes for Biden in several key swing states on January 6", as Greene phrased it.
 December 21: According to Rep. Mo Brooks (R-Ala.),  Brooks told Politico there are plans to challenge the results in six states, said total debate time could clock in at around 18 hours. That means the vote-counting process could bleed into the wee hours of Jan. 7. Attendees include Vice President Mike Pence, Mark Meadows, Rudy Giuliani, Rep. Andy Biggs (R-Ariz.), Rep. Matt Gaetz (R-Fl.), Rep. Louie Gohmert (R-Tx.) Rep. Jody Hice (R-Ga.), Rep. Jim Jordan (R-Ohio), and Rep.-elect Marjorie Taylor Greene (R-Ga.).
 December 22:
 Oath Keepers' Florida chapter leader Kelly Meggs writes on Facebook "Trump said It's gonna be wild!!!!!!!", adding "It's gonna be wild!!!!!!! He wants us to make it WILD that's what he's saying. He called us all to the Capitol and wants us tomakeitwild!!!! SirYesSir!!! Gentlemen we are heading to DC pack your shit!!"
 George Papadopoulos receives a presidential pardon. He would later participate in the D.C. events of January 5.
 December 23: 
 Phil Waldron texted Mark Meadows, informing him that an Arizona judge had dismissed a lawsuit in which GOP lawmakers demanded access to voting machines. Waldron acknowledged that his opponents might try to "delay" him from accessing the machines. Meadows replied: "Pathetic".  
 Roger Stone receives a presidential pardon. He would later participate in the DC events of January 5.  
 Eastman wrote a memo on January 6 strategy proposing that "Pence then gavels President Trump as re-elected ...The main thing here is that Pence should do this without asking for permission..." At 1:32 p.m., Eastman emailed Trump’s assistant asking to speak to the president about "strategic thinking." Five minutes later, the White House called Eastman; the call lasted nearly 23 minutes.  
 December 27: 
 In a phone call with Trump, acting Attorney General Jeffrey Rosen and acting Deputy Attorney General Richard Donoghue remind him that "DOJ can't and won't snap its fingers and change the outcome of the election." Trump replies: "Just say that the election was corrupt and leave the rest to me and the R[epublican] Congressmen".
 President Trump promotes the January 6 rally on Twitter.
 December 28:
 Jeffrey Clark drafts a letter to Georgia's governor and leaders of the Georgia House and Senate. The letter asks the Georgia General Assembly to call a "special session" to consider claims of election irregularities, decide who "won the most legal votes," and "take whatever action is necessary to ensure that one of the slates of Electors cast on December 14 will be accepted by Congress on January 6." Pat Cipollone warns Trump that the letter will "damage everyone who touches it. And we should have nothing to do with that letter." The letter is not sent. (It is later mentioned in ethics charges filed against Clark on July 19, 2022.)
 December 30:
 President Trump again announces the date of the January 6 rally on Twitter.
 The domain name MarchtoSaveAmerica.com is registered.
 A popular far-right YouTuber posted a video in which he said he anticipated over a million "armed Americans" would be in the streets for a "red wedding" on January 6, a reference to a fictional massacre in Game of Thrones.
 December 31: 
 By this date, the wildprotest.com website settles on a protest location just northeast of the Capitol building. On New Year's Eve, District of Columbia Mayor Muriel Bowser requests a limited national guard deployment as downtown merchants began boarding up their businesses.
 The Berkeley Research Group, hired by the Trump campaign to investigate whether there had been voter fraud, had found nothing, and at some point during the last few days of December, they reported this to Trump and Meadows on a conference call.

Friday, January 1, 2021 
 National Park Service grants a permit for a First Amendment rally "March for Trump" at The Ellipse to Women for America First (chaired by Amy Kremer, co-founder of Women for Trump), with an estimated attendance of 5,000. 
 Trump tweets the date and time of the January 6 rally.  He then retweets a supporter who wrote, "The calvary is coming, Mr. President! JANUARY 6th | Washington, DC", to which Trump responds, "A great honor!".

Saturday, January 2, 2021 
 On a conference call with Georgia Secretary of State Brad Raffensperger, Trump claimed that "we have won this election in Georgia," and he demanded from Raffensperger: "I just want to find, uh, 11,780 votes, which is one more than [the 11,779 vote margin of defeat] we have, because we won the state." He warned Raffensperger that he was taking a "big risk" by not signing on to the false claim of a Trump victory. 
 Thirteen U.S. senators, including Ted Cruz and Josh Hawley, along with 100 Republican members of the House, vow to object to the election certification.
 Amy Kremer of Women for America First announces a rally at the Ellipse in Washington, D.C., on January 6 starting at 7 am.
 Carol Corbin (DOD) texts United States Capitol Police (USCP) Deputy Chief Sean Gallagher, Protective Services Bureau, to determine whether USCP is considering a request for National Guard soldiers for January 6, 2021, event

Sunday, January 3, 2021 
 USCP Deputy Chief Gallagher replies to DOD via text that a request for National Guard support is not forthcoming at this time after consultation with USCP COP Sund. 
 Trump announces that he will be at the Ellipse rally.
 Trump orders recently-appointed Secretary of Defense Christopher C. Miller to "do whatever was necessary to protect the demonstrators" on January 6. 
 Dustin Stockton, a former Breitbart employee helping to plan the Ellipse event, helps move speakers to the January 5 rally to make room for Trump to speak at the Ellipse rally.
 A 1:00 pm protest at the U.S. Capitol is added to the January 6 rally announcement on the March to Save America website.
 An internal Capitol Police intelligence report warns that enraged protesters flanked by white supremacists and extreme militia groups are likely to arrive in Washington armed for battle and target Congress on January 6.
 The National Park Service issues a permit to "Rally to Revival" for the January 5 rally in Freedom Plaza.  The permit notes that there is no march associated with the event.
 In a heated Oval Office meeting, Trump pushes his plan to install Jeffrey Clark as head of DOJ. (Clark, the top energy lawyer at DOJ, supports Trump's claims of election fraud.) Officials from the DOJ and White House tell Trump they don't support this plan, and some issue ultimatums: Acting attorney general Jeffrey Rosen, his deputy Richard Donoghue, and Office of Legal Counsel head Steven Engel all threaten to resign if Trump installs Clark.

Monday, January 4, 2021
 USCP COP Sund asks Senate Sergeant at Arms (SSAA) Michael Stenger and House Sergeant at Arms (HSAA) Paul Irving for authority to have National Guard to assist with security for the January 6, 2021, event based on briefing with law enforcement partners and revised intelligence
 COP Sund's request is denied. SSAA and H.SAA tells COP Sund to contact General Walker at DC National Guard to discuss the guard's ability to support a request if needed.
 COP Sund notifies General Walker of DC National Guard, indicating that the USCP may need DC National Guard support for the January 6, 2021 , but does not have the authority to request at this time.
 General Walker advises COP Sund that in the event of an authorized request, DC National Guard could quickly repurpose 125 troops helping to provide DC with COVD-related assistance. Troops would need to be sworn in as USCP.
 Proud Boys leader Enrique Tarrio is arrested in D.C. and charged for burning a Black Lives Matter banner on December 12 and possession of two high capacity firearm magazines that were in his possession at the time of his arrest.
 
 The National Park Service forecast the protest crowd size at 15,000.

Tuesday, January 5, 2021 
 8:57 a.m.: Steve Bannon calls Trump. They speak for 11 minutes.
 After the phone call, Bannon addresses his podcast audience: "All hell is going to break loose tomorrow. We're on ... the point of attack ... strap in."
 In the morning, thousands of Trump supporters gather at Freedom Plaza near the White House in advance of planned protests of the certification of Joe Biden as President-elect. The first rally is the March to Save America (no marching) from 1–2 p.m., then Stop the Steal from 3:30–5:00 p.m., followed by the Eighty Percent Coalition from 5:00–8:30 p.m.  
 Capitol Police Chief Steven Sund holds a teleconference with top law enforcement and military officials from D.C., including the FBI, U.S. Secret Service and the National Guard; Sund later wrote no entity provided any intelligence indicating that there would be a coordinated violent attack on the United States Capitol by thousands of well-equipped armed insurrectionists.
 U.S. House Representative Zoe Lofgren (D-CA) holds a teleconference with Capitol Police Chief Steven Sund and House Sergeant-at-Arms Paul Irving; Sund tells Lofgren that the National Guard is on standby and that Capitol Police are well-staffed and prepared for the protests.
 After speaking with Representative Lofgren, Sund reiterates to Representative Tim Ryan (D-OH) that Capitol Police are prepared.
 D.C. National Guard Commanding Major General William J. Walker receives new orders from Secretary of the Army Ryan McCarthy stating that he must seek approval from McCarthy and Defense secretary Miller before preparing to respond to a civil disturbance. Previously, he had authority to respond without first seeking permission.
 At least ten people are arrested during the evening and into Wednesday morning, several on weapons charges.
 Federal Protective Service officers notice protesters trying to camp on federal property.
 DC Mayor Bowser writes letter to Acting Secretary Miller and other authorities that the District government is not requesting further operational help in managing the expected protest crowd.
 Pipe bombs found the next day were placed outside the Washington DC offices of the RNC and DNC national headquarters between 7:30-8:30pm, according to the FBI.
 Trump made several calls to his associates at the Willard Hotel, where a command center or "war room" had been established in a set of rooms and suites. Trump personal attorney Rudy Giuliani, Bannon, Eastman, and Boris Epshteyn led the team. Michael Flynn, Roger Stone and Bernard Kerik were also present. Trump called to tell them that Pence was refusing the Pence Card strategy that Eastman had proposed earlier in the day in an Oval Office meeting. He discussed ways to delay the certification in order to get alternate slates of electors for Trump sent to Congress, as he, Giuliani and Eastman had discussed by conference call with 300 state legislators on January 2. Trump discussed some topics only with lawyers at the Willard so as to preserve the confidentiality afforded by attorney-client privilege.
 9:46 p.m.: Steve Bannon calls Trump. They speak for 6 minutes.
 10:00 p.m.: Kayleigh McEnany texts Elliot Gaiser at approximately this time, asking him whether Pence has the power to object to the election results. She later told the January 6th committee that she was curious about this possibility because, earlier that day or the day before, she had overheard Trump discussing it in the Oval Office with an outside attorney (whom she believed was John Eastman) on speakerphone, while Corey Lewandowski listened in person in the Oval Office.

Attack on the Capitol
At noon, Trump began an over one-hour speech encouraging  protesters to march to the U.S. Capitol. At 12:49 p.m., Capitol Police responded to reports of an explosive device, later identified as a pipe bomb. Nineteen minutes before Trump ended his speech, rioters overran the perimeter of the Capitol building.

At 2:44 p.m., a Capitol Police officer inside the Speaker's Lobby adjacent to the House chambers shot and fatally wounded rioter Ashli Babbitt as she climbed through a broken window of a barricaded door. Minutes later, Governor of Virginia Ralph Northam activated all available assets of the State of Virginia including the Virginia National Guard to aid the U.S. Capitol, although the Department of Defense still had not authorized it. By 3:15 p.m., assets from Virginia began rolling into D.C.

An hour later, at 4:17 p.m, a video of Trump was uploaded to Twitter in which he instructed "you have to go home now". Fifteen minutes later, Secretary Miller authorized the D.C. National Guard to actually deploy.

Wednesday, January 6, 2021

Early morning (before 9:00 a.m.) 
 1:00 a.m.: Trump tweets: "If Vice President @Mike_Pence comes through for us, we will win the Presidency."
 1:13a.m.: Ali Alexander, Stop the Steal organizer, tweets "First official day of the rebellion."
 3:23a.m.: Ron Watkins, imageboard administrator and prominent QAnon figure, posts a tweet accusing Vice President Mike Pence of orchestrating a coup against Trump. He also linked to a blog post which called for "the immediate arrest of [Pence], for treason."
 7:29 a.m.: Courtney Holland, who later became communications director for the Republican Senate nominee in Nevada, tweets that she is walking to the Stop the Steal rally with Scott Presler, Megan Barth, and Rose Tennent. Those three people are scheduled to speak later at a different rally at the Capitol.
 7:30 a.m.: White House chief of staff Mark Meadows texts Representative Jim Jordan "I have pushed for this" but is "not sure it is going to happen," referring to Pence overturning the election results.
 8:07 a.m.: Secret Service countersurveillance agents reported that “members of the crowd are wearing ballistic helmets, body armor and carrying radio equipment and military grade backpacks.”
 8:17a.m.: President Trump tweets allegations of vote fraud, stating,States want to correct their votes, which they now know were based on irregularities and fraud, plus corrupt process never received legislative approval. All Mike Pence has to do is send them back to the States, AND WE WIN. Do it Mike, this is a time for extreme courage!"

Rallies

9:00 a.m. 
 9:00a.m.: At start time on permit for First Amendment rally "March for Trump" speeches, the "Save America" rally (or "March to Save America") begins. Above the podium at The Ellipse are banners for "Save America March". Mo Brooks (R–AL) makes a speech about "kicking ass", asking "Will you fight for America?"
 9:24 a.m.: Trump has an approximately 10-minute phone call with Representative Jim Jordan.
 9:45a.m.: A Federal Protective Service liaison officer informs the Capitol Police that more than the permitted 30,000 protesters are expected at the Ellipse, the Freedom Plaza permit was increased from 5,000 to 30,000, and the protest outside the Sylven Theater is permitted for 15,000.  According to Newsweek, "Six times as many protestors—as many as 120,000—would show up on the Mall on January 6, according to classified numbers still not released by the Secret Service and the FBI but seen by Newsweek."
 9:52 a.m.: Trump has a 26-minute phone call with adviser Stephen Miller.

10:00 a.m. 
 10:00 a.m.: Before this time, White House deputy chief of staff Tony Ornato informs Trump that authorities have spotted armed individuals at the crowd gathering at the Ellipse.
 10:15 a.m.: Around this time, Tony Ornato, along with Cassidy Hutchinson, who was an aide to Mark Meadows, inform Meadows about the armed Trump supporters.
 10:30a.m.: Benjamin Philips splits from his group to park, not reuniting but later dying from a stroke at George Washington University Hospital.
 10:30a.m.: ~200-300 Proud Boys started their march down the National Mall towards the U.S. Capitol. 
 10:47a.m.: Rudy Giuliani begins a speech in which he calls for "trial by combat".
 10:58a.m.: A Proud Boys contingent leaves the rally and marches toward the Capitol Building. (According to later testimony. a "couple of hundred" Proud Boys began walking east, "down the Mall...towards the Capitol" at approximately 10:30 a.m.)

11:00 a.m. 
 11:00a.m.: The Ellipse, located south of the White House, is filled with Trump supporters.
 11:06 a.m.: "There is no official record of President Trump receiving or placing a call between 11:06 a.m. and 6:54 p.m.," Representative Elaine Luria stated at a public hearing a year later.
 11:30a.m.: 
 Acting Secretary of Defense Christopher C. Miller participates in a tabletop exercise on Department of Defense contingency response options for the D.C. protests.
 The motorcade of Vice President–elect Kamala Harris arrived at DNC headquarters. (Law enforcement would discover a pipe bomb at 1:07 p.m., only several yards away from where her motorcade had passed through the garage of DNC headquarters, and they would evacuate Harris seven minutes after that.)
 11:46 a.m.: Some Proud Boys, including Joe Biggs and Ethan Nordean, are gathered where Trump is about to speak.
 11:57 a.m.: President Trump begins his over one-hour speech. He repeats allegations that the election was stolen, criticizes Vice President Mike Pence by name a half-dozen times (though this wasn't part of his prepared remarks), accuses fellow Republicans of not doing enough to back up his allegations, and states that he will walk with the crowd to the Capitol.

12:00p.m. 
 12:00p.m.: A Federal Protective Service briefing email reports that about 300 Proud Boys are at the Capitol, a man in a tree near the Ellipse is holding what looks like a rifle, and some of the 25,000 people around the White House are hiding bags in bushes. The email warns that the Proud Boys are threatening to shut down the downtown water system.
 12:05p.m.: Rep. Paul Gosar tweets a demand for Biden to concede by the next morning.
 12:16 p.m. Trump tells the crowd: "I know that everyone here will soon be marching over to the Capitol building to peacefully and patriotically make your voices heard." Finishing his speech with "We fight.  We fight like hell and if you don't fight like hell, you're not going to have a country anymore.  So let's walk down Pennsylvania Avenue."
 12:20p.m.: A Federal Protective Service officer writes in an email, "POTUS is encouraging the protesters to march to capitol grounds and continue protesting there."
 12:26 p.m.: Pence arrives at the Capitol.
 12:28p.m.: A Federal Protective Service officer reports 10,000–15,000 people moving towards the Capitol down Pennsylvania, Constitution, and Madison Avenues.

 12:30p.m.: Crowds of pro-Trump supporters gather outside the U.S. Capitol building. 
 12:45p.m.: 
 FBI, Capitol Police, and ATF responded to the pipe bomb found outside RNC headquarters, which had been planted the night before.
 Proud Boys arrive at the Peace Monument northwest of the Capitol.
 12:49p.m.:
 Capitol Police respond to a report of a possible explosive device at the Republican National Committee Headquarters, which is later identified as a pipe bomb. A second pipe bomb at the headquarters of the Democratic National Committee would be found at 1:07pm. Buildings next to these headquarters are evacuated.   
 A police sweep of the area identifies a vehicle which held one handgun, an M4 Carbine assault rifle with loaded magazine, and components for 11 Molotov cocktails with homemade napalm. Around 6:30p.m, the driver was apprehended carrying two unregistered handguns as he returned to the vehicle. He is not suspected of planting the pipe bombs.
 Joe Biggs and Ethan Nordean, again, are caught on video in the crowd outside the Capitol.
 12:52 p.m. Some Oath Keepers, including Jessica Watkins, leave the Ellipse.
 12:53p.m.: Rioters overwhelm police along the outer perimeter west of the Capitol building, pushing aside temporary fencing. Some protesters immediately follow, while others, at least initially, remain behind and admonish the others: "Don't do it. You're breaking the law." By 1:03p.m., a vanguard of rioters have overrun three layers of barricades and have forced police officers to the base of the west Capitol steps.
 12:57p.m.: Federal Protective Service officers report that the Capitol Police barricade on the west side of the Capitol building has been breached by a large group.
 12:58 p.m.: Chief Sund asks House Sergeant at Arms Paul D. Irving and Senate Sergeant at Arms Michael C. Stenger to declare an emergency and call for deployment of the National Guard. Irving and Stenger state that they will forward the request up their chains of command. Soon afterwards, aides to Congressional leaders arrive in Stenger's office and are outraged to learn that he has not yet called for any reinforcement.  Phone records obtained at the Senate Hearings reflect that Sund first reached out to Irving to request the National Guard at 12:58 p.m. on the day of the attack. Sund then called the Senate sergeant-at-arms at the time, Michael Stenger, at 1:05 p.m. Sund repeated his request in a call at 1:28 p.m. and then again at 1:34 p.m., 1:39 p.m. and 1:45 p.m. that day. The Capitol Police Board consisting of the Architect of the Capitol, the House Sergeant at Arms, and the Senate Sergeant at Arms have the authority to request the national guard to the Capitol, but had made the decision three days earlier not to do so.

1:00p.m. 

 1:00p.m.: 
 Senators and Vice President Pence walk to the House chamber.
 US Capitol Police Chief Steven Sund calls D.C. Metropolitan Police Chief Contee, who deploys 100 officers to the Capitol complex, the earliest arriving within 10 minutes.
 1:02p.m.: Pence refuses to go along with Trump's plan to pick and choose electors, and tweets a letter stating in part,  Pence had not shown it to the White House Counsel in advance.
 1:05p.m.:
 Congress meets in joint session to confirm Joe Biden's electoral victory.
 Acting Secretary of Defense Miller receives open-source intelligence reports of demonstrators moving towards the U.S. Capitol.
 1:07p.m.: Authorities respond to the headquarters of the Democratic National Committee, following discovery of the second pipe bomb.  When police arrive, Vice President-elect Kamala Harris was inside.
 1:10p.m.:  Trump ends his speech by urging his supporters to march upon the Capitol Building: 
 1:11p.m.: First MPD officers arrive at lower west plaza to confront rioters approaching the Capitol
 1:12p.m.: Rep. Paul Gosar (R–AZ) and Sen. Ted Cruz (R–TX) object to certifying the votes made in the 2020 United States presidential election in Arizona. The joint session separates into House and Senate chambers to debate the objection.
 1:14p.m.: Due to the pipe bomb (see 1:07pm), Vice President-elect Harris is evacuated from DNC Headquarters.
 1:17p.m.: Trump's motorcade leaves the Ellipse. The Secret Service does not allow Trump to go to the Capitol and drives him back to the White House against his wishes. Trump behaved angrily, according to multiple witnesses who testified for the House committee.
 1:19 p.m.: Trump's motorcade arrives at the White House.
 1:21 p.m.: "The Presidential Daily Diary...contains no information for the period between 1:21 p.m. and 4:03 p.m.," Representative Elaine Luria stated at a public hearing a year later. "The chief White House photographer wanted to take pictures because it was, in her words, 'very important for his archives and for history.' But she was told, 'no photographs.'"

Trump watches TV (1:25–4:03 p.m.) 
According to the final report of the January 6 House select committee:"Here’s what President Trump did during the 187 minutes between the end of his speech and when he finally told rioters to go home: For hours, he watched the attack from his TV screen. His channel of choice was Fox News. He issued a few tweets, some on his own inclination and some only at the repeated behest of his daughter and other trusted advisors. He made several phone calls, some to his personal lawyer Rudolph Giuliani, some to Members of Congress about continuing their objections to the electoral certification, even though the attack was well underway.

Here’s what President Trump did not do: He did not call any relevant law enforcement agency to ensure they were working to quell the violence. He did not call the Secretary of Defense; he did not call the Attorney General; he did not call the Secretary of Homeland Security. And for hours on end, he refused the repeated requests—from nearly everyone who talked to him—to simply tell the mob to go home."
 1:25 p.m.:
 Trump enters the Oval Office private dining room and stays there, watching Fox News, until after 4 p.m. (Three months later, Trump acknowledged to a journalist that the Capitol police "did lose control" of the mob, but he claimed he did not hear of the attack while in meetings with his chief of staff and instead learned of it "afterwards, and ... on the late side" upon turning on the television.)
 White House press secretary Stephanie Grisham texts First Lady Melania Trump: "Do you want to tweet that peaceful protests are the right of every American, but there is no place for lawlessness and violence?" She immediately responds: "No". (Melania Trump didn't tweet at all on the day of the attack, and did not tweet to condemn the violence until five days later.)
 1:26p.m.: U.S. Capitol Police order evacuation of at least two buildings in the Capitol complex, including the Cannon House Office Building and the Madison Building of the Library of Congress.
 1:30p.m.: 
 Capitol Police are overwhelmed and retreat up the steps of the Capitol. Lawmakers see the police in the halls.
 Large numbers of Trump supporters march from the Ellipse 1.5 miles down Pennsylvania Avenue toward the Capitol. Lawmakers watch their approach on online videos.
 1:34p.m.: D.C. Mayor Muriel Bowser requests via phone that Army Secretary Ryan D. McCarthy provide an unspecified number of additional forces.
 1:35p.m.: In Senate deliberations, Senate Majority Leader Mitch McConnell (R–KY) warns that refusing to certify the election results under false pretenses would push American democracy into a "death spiral".
 1:39 p.m.: The White House switchboard connects with Rudy Giuliani for 3 minutes and 53 seconds.
 1:49p.m.: 
 Capitol Police Chief Sund requests immediate assistance from District of Columbia National Guard (DCNG) Commander Major General William J. Walker. Major General Walker loads guardsmen onto buses in anticipation of receiving permission from the Secretary of the Army to deploy.
 Trump tweets a video replay of the Ellipse rally where he'd wrapped up his speech a half-hour earlier.
 1:50p.m.: D.C. Metropolitan Police on-scene incident commander Robert Glover declares a riot.
 1:51p.m.:
 Trump supporter Alex Jones speaks from a bullhorn to the crowd on west side exhorting them to remain peaceful and to "not fight the police". He directs them to "the other [East] side" where he claims they have a permit and a stage.  
 Radio talk  show host and former FEMA director Michael D. Brown tweets the baseless claim that the people breaching Capitol security are likely antifa, Black Lives Matter protestors, or other insurgents disguised as Trump supporters, and suggests the attack could be a psychological warfare operation.
 1:54p.m.: Todd Herman, guest hosting The Rush Limbaugh Show, informs his large national radio audience of Brown's claim that the people breaching security are not Trump supporters.
 1:55 p.m.: Secret Service notified they are not going to the Capitol, after holding the motorcade at the White House for possibly doing so.
 1:58p.m.: Along the east side of the Capitol, a much smaller police presence retreats from a different mob, removing a barrier along the northeast corner of the building. Oath Keepers Kenneth Harrelson (later charged with sedition) and Jason Dolan had arrived at the east side of the Capitol "shortly before 2 p.m."
 1:59p.m.: Chief Sund receives the first reports that rioters had reached the Capitol's doors and windows and were trying to break in.

2:00p.m. 

 2:00p.m.: The mob removes the last barrier protecting the east side of the Capitol.
 2:03 p.m.: The White House switchboard connects with Rudy Giuliani for 8 minutes.
 2:05p.m.: Kevin Greeson is declared dead after suffering a heart attack outdoors on the Capitol grounds.
 2:10p.m.: 
 The mob west of the Capitol chase police up the steps, breaching the final barricade and approach an entrance directly below the Senate chamber.
 House Sergeant at Arms Irving calls Chief Sund with formal approval to request assistance from the National Guard.

 2:11p.m.: Rioter Dominic Pezzola breaks a window on the northwest side of the Capitol with a plastic shield.
 2:12p.m.: The first rioter enters the Capitol through the broken window in the Senate wing of the building, opening a door for others.
 2:13p.m.: 
 Entries in a National Security Council chat convey that "2 windows have been kicked in" and "Capitol is breached". 
 Vice President Pence is removed from the Senate chamber by his lead Secret Service agent, Tim Giebels, who brings him to a nearby office about 100 feet from the landing.
 The Senate is gaveled into recess.
 2:14p.m.: 
 Rioters chase a lone Capitol Police officer up northwest stairs, where there are doors to the Senate chamber in both directions, as police inside the chamber attempt to lock doors. The mob gets within 40 feet of Vice President Pence, but does not catch sight of him because he has already been moved to safety one minute earlier. Officer Eugene Goodman leads the mob to backup in front of a set of Senate doors while senators inside attempt to evacuate. 
 Proud Boy Joe Biggs enters the Capitol building. 
 Representative Gosar speaks to the House against certifying Arizona's electoral votes.
 Federal Protective Service officers report that the Capitol has been breached.
 2:15 p.m.: Rioters use a hammer to break and open a door.
 2:16p.m.: Federal Protective Service officers report that the House and Senate are being locked down.
 2:18p.m.:
 An official warns in a National Security Council chat that "VP may be stuck at the Capitol" if security doesn't reach a decision to move him within 2–3 minutes.
 Speaker of the House Nancy Pelosi (D–CA) is removed from the chamber by her protective detail.  Representative Gosar continues addressing the House, despite the confusion, while ranking member Jim McGovern (D-CA) steps in as Speaker.
 2:20p.m.: 
 The House is gaveled into recess and starts to evacuate. 
 The National Security Council chat reports the breach of "Second Floor" and "Senate Door".
 2:22p.m.: Army Secretary McCarthy has a phone call with Mayor Bowser, D.C. Deputy Mayor John Falcicchio, Director of the D.C. Homeland Security and Emergency Management Agency Christopher Rodriguez, and leadership of the Metropolitan  Police in which additional DCNG support is requested.
 2:23p.m.: 
 Rioters attempt to breach the police line formed by barricades of bicycle racks. As a police lieutenant sprays the crowd with a chemical substance, rioter Julian Elie Khater raises his arm above the mob and sprays a chemical substance toward United States Capitol Police officer Brian Sicknick, who dies the following day from a stroke.
 A conversation over Washington's Metropolitan Police Department radio: "We're starting to get surrounded. They're taking the North Front scaffolding", someone says. Another voice on the radio warns: "Unless we're getting more munitions, we're not going to be able to hold." A reply: "A door has been breached, and people are gaining access into the Capitol."
 Nancy Pelosi walks through the complex, speaking on a phone. She says that if Congress can't "finish the proceedings", the insurrectionists "will have had a complete victory."
 2:24p.m.: 
Entries in a National Security Council chat convey that there are "explosions on the rotunda steps" and "Service at the capitol does not sound good right now". The official who wrote this, when later interviewed by the January 6 House committee, explained the second comment: "The members of the VP detail at this time were starting to fear for their own lives...we came very close to either Service having to use lethal options or worse....they're screaming and saying things like 'say goodbye to the family'." (The committee did not reveal the official's name.) 
President Trump tweets "Mike Pence didn't have the courage to do what should have been done to protect our Country and our Constitution, giving States a chance to certify a corrected set of facts, not the fraudulent or inaccurate ones which they were asked to previously certify. USA demands the truth!" When Twitter reinstated Trump's account in November 2022, this tweet was gone. The U.S. House select committee investigating January 6 wrote that this tweet "inflamed and exacerbated the mob violence"; this assessment was part of the committee's criminal referral of Trump for insurrection.
 2:25p.m.: 
 Army Secretary McCarthy ordered staff to prepare movement of the emergency reaction force, which could be ready in 20 minutes, to the Capitol.
 Over the next three minutes, "rioters breached the East Rotunda doors, other rioters breached the police line in the Capitol Crypt, Vice President Pence had to be evacuated from his Senate office, and Rep. McCarthy was evacuated from his Capitol office", according to the U.S. House select committee on January 6 in the introduction to its final report.

 2:26p.m.: D.C.'s homeland security director Chris Rodriquez coordinates a conference call with Mayor Bowser, the chiefs of the Capitol Police (Sund) and Metropolitan Police (Contee), and DCNG Maj. Gen. Walker. As the DCNG does not report to a governor, but to the President, Maj. Gen. Walker patched in the Office of the Secretary of the Army, noting that he would need Pentagon authorization to deploy. Lt. Gen. Walter E. Piatt, director of the Army Staff, noted that the Pentagon needed Capitol Police authorization to step onto Capitol grounds. Sund began describing the breach by rioters but the call became unintelligible as multiple people began asking questions at the same time. Metro Police Chief Robert Contee asked for clarification from Capitol Police Chief Sund: "Steve, are you requesting National Guard assistance at the Capitol?" to which Chief Sund replied, "I am making urgent, urgent, immediate request for National Guard assistance." According to Sund, Lt. Gen. Piatt said, "I don't like the visual of the National Guard standing a police line with the Capitol in the background", and that he prefer that the Guard relieve police posts around D.C. to allow police to deploy to the Capitol. Sund pleaded with Lt. Gen. Piatt to send the Guard, but Lt. Gen. Piatt said only Army Secretary McCarthy had the authority to approve such a request and he could not recommend that Secretary McCarthy approve the request for assistance directly to the Capitol. The D.C. officials were subsequently described as "flabbergasted" at this message. McCarthy would later state that he was not in this conference call because he was already entering a meeting with senior Department leadership. Piatt contests this description of the call, denying that he talked about visuals and stating that he stayed on the conference call while senior Defense Department officials were meeting. The Army falsely denied for two weeks that Lt. Gen. Charles A. Flynn - the Army deputy chief of staff for operations, plans and training - was in this call. His brother Michael Flynn, a retired Trump National Security Advisor, had pledged an oath to the QAnon conspiracy theory, though there are no indications that Lt. Gen. Flynn shares his brother's beliefs.
 2:26p.m.:
 Trump calls Senator Mike Lee (R–UT), having misdialed Senator Tommy Tuberville (R–AL). Lee passes his phone to Tuberville, who informs Trump that Pence had just been evacuated from the Senate chamber. "I said 'Mr President, they've taken the Vice President out. They want me to get off the phone, I gotta go'," he recounted to reporters of his call.
 After receipt of a call from D.C. Mayor Muriel E. Bowser indicating that DoD had refused to send assistance to the U.S. Capitol, the Public Safety Secretary of Virginia, Brian Moran, dispatches the Virginia State Police to the Capitol as permitted by mutual aid agreement with D.C.
 Security video shows Secret Service moving the Vice President and his family to a new secure location.
 The House is briefly called back into session.
 2:28p.m.: 
 One of Nancy Pelosi's staffers whispered: "They're with...we need Capitol Police, I think—come into the hallway. They're pounding on doors trying to find her."
 Capitol Police Chief Steven Sund reiterates his request for National Guard support to help shore up the perimeter of the Capitol.
 2:29p.m.: The House goes into recess again.
 2:30p.m.:
 Secretary Miller, Chairman of the Joint Chiefs of Staff Gen. Mark Milley, and Army Secretary McCarthy meet to discuss Capitol Police and D.C. government requests. 
 Shortly before this time, The Washington Times publishes a story by Rowan Scarborough falsely claiming facial recognition company XRVision identified antifa members among the crowd at the Capitol. The Times corrects the story the next day after BuzzFeed News reports that XRVision threatened the Times with legal action over the story. Before the correction, the story amasses 360,000 shares and likes on Facebook. 
 2:32 p.m. Fox News anchor Laura Ingraham tweets Chief of Staff Meadows: "Hey Mark, The president needs to tell people in the Capitol to go home."
 2:38p.m.: President Trump tweetsPlease support our Capitol Police and Law Enforcement. They are truly on the side of our Country. Stay peaceful!

 2:42p.m.: 
 Rioters carrying flags walk down the hallways, kicking at office doors, chanting "Defend the Constitution! Defend your liberty!" and "1776!"
 The Senate Chamber is breached by rioters.
 By this time, Senator Chuck Schumer is in "a secure location", and the Senate is locked down.
 In a "secure undisclosed location"—a small auditorium with about 50 chairs—Pelosi stands at the front of the room and asks how to maintain the impression of "some security or some confidence that government can function and that you can elect the President of the United States. Did we go back into session?" Someone replies: "We did go back into session, but now apparently everybody on the floor is putting on tear gas masks to prepare for a breach." Pelosi, seeming not to have understood a key phrase, asks the person to repeat it. The person reiterates: "Tear gas masks." Pelosi turns and says to someone else: "Do you believe this?"
 Capitol Police radio: "We need an area for the House members. They're all walking over now through the tunnels."
 2:44p.m.: Rioter Ashli Babbitt is shot by Capitol Police while attempting to force entry into the Speaker's Lobby adjacent to the House chambers by climbing through a window that led to the House floor.
 2:45p.m.: 
 Federal Protective Service officers report, "Shots fired 2nd floor house side inside the capitol."
 Jessica Watkins and Donovan Crowl, later charged with seditious conspiracy, enter the Capitol building.
 Shortly after this time, some people break into Nancy Pelosi's office and scrawl a message for her: "WE WILL NOT BACK DOWN".
 2:47 p.m.: A large group of people presses against an outer door. One says: "Here we go. Here's the next rush! There's a push inside, with resistance!"
 2:49p.m.: 
 After discussion with his chief of staff, Clark Mercer, the Governor of Virginia, Ralph Northam, activates all available assets of the State of Virginia including the Virginia National Guard to aid the US capitol. Authorization from DoD required for legal deployment of Virginia National Guard in D.C. was not granted.
 Trump aide Robert Gabriel texts: “Potus im sure is loving this.”
 2:53 p.m. Donald Trump, Jr. tweets to Meadows: "He's got to condem [sic] this shit. Asap.The captiol [sic] police tweet is not enough. "
 2:57p.m.: A rioter, inches away from a Metropolitan police officer, yells: "Bring her out. Bring her out here. We're coming in if you don't bring her out."

3:00p.m. 
 3:00p.m.: Chuck Schumer, seated with Nancy Pelosi, tells her: "I'm gonna call up the effin' Secretary of DoD." Then, speaking on the phone to Christopher Miller, acting Secretary of Defense, he says: "We have some Senators who are still in their hideaways. They need massive personnel now. Can you get the Maryland National Guard to come too?" Nancy Pelosi then speaks into Schumer's phone, telling Miller she plans to call the DC mayor to learn what other backup may have already been called. (She credits House Majority Leader Steny Hoyer, standing behind her, for that advice.)
 3:04p.m.: Secretary Miller, with advice from senior Defense leadership, formally approves "activation" of the 1,100 soldiers in the DCNG. Army Secretary McCarthy orders the DCNG to begin full "mobilization". (However, it will be another hour and a half before Miller approves an "operational plan" for the DCNG's deployment to the Capitol.) 

 3:05p.m.: House Minority Leader Kevin McCarthy (R–CA) started a phone-in interview on live TV with WUSA. McCarthy said he had called the president to urge him to "calm people down" and in reply the president had sent out a tweet. Months later, McCarthy would claim to police that, based on his phone call with Trump, it wasn't obvious to him that Trump was aware of the violence inside the Capitol at the time.
 3:08 p.m: Anton Lunyk, Francis Connor, Antonio Ferrigno—three friends who traveled from Brooklyn—enter the Capitol through the Senate Wing Door. They enter Senator Jeff Merkley's office. (Though they have no known ties to the White House, someone at the White House will call Lunyk an hour later.)
 3:09 p.m.: A rioter walks through the halls, singing: "Nancy Pelosi! Where you at, Nancy? Nancy! Where are you, Nancy? We're looking for you!" (Someone responds: "She's in jail!") The rioter resumes: "Nancy, oh Nancy! Nancy! Nancy! Where are you, Nancy? We're looking for you, Nancy!" (This video was presented by prosecutors at the second impeachment trial of Donald Trump.)
 3:09 p.m. former White House Chief of Staff Reince Priebus to current CoS Meadows: "TELL THEM TO GO HOME !!!"
 3:10p.m.: Fairfax County, Virginia, deputy county executive Dave Rohrer informs county officials that county police are being dispatched to assist Capitol Police in response to a mutual aid request.
 3:12 p.m. Lunyk, Connor, and Ferrigno walk through the Capitol crypt and exit by climbing out a window.
 3:13p.m.: President Trump tweetsI am asking for everyone at the U.S. Capitol to remain peaceful. No violence! Remember, WE are the Party of Law & Order – respect the Law and our great men and women in Blue. Thank you!
 3:15p.m.:
 House Speaker Pelosi calls the Governor of Virginia. The Governor of Virginia, Ralph Northam, confirms to House Speaker Pelosi that all assets of the State of Virginia including the National Guard are being sent to aid the U.S. Capitol. 
 First assets from Virginia begin rolling into D.C.
 3:19p.m.: Army Secretary McCarthy has a phone call with Senator Schumer and House Speaker Pelosi about Mayor Bowser's request. McCarthy explains that a full DCNG mobilization has been approved.
 3:21p.m.: Albuquerque Cosper Head pulls Officer Michael Fanone into the crowd, where Daniel Rodriguez tases Fanone in the neck. (In 2022, Head and Rodriguez are sentenced to prison for this.) Fanone is carried unconscious back into the tunnel.
 3:22p.m.: 
 Nancy Pelosi calls Virginia Governor Ralph Northam and asks if he's discussed sending the Virginia National Guard, noting that Steny Hoyer has already spoken to Maryland's Governor Larry Hogan and that Northam may need federal approval to send troops to "another jurisdiction". When the call ends, someone in the room tells Pelosi that the Virginia National Guard has been called in, and Pelosi confirms that Northam just told her "they sent 200 of state police and a unit of the National Guard."
 Rohrer informs Fairfax County officials that the county is suspending fire, rescue, or emergency transportation to D.C. hospitals and "upgrading response and command structure."
 3:25p.m.: Pelosi and Schumer sit together holding a phone and speak to acting attorney general Jeffrey Rosen. Pelosi acknowledges that rioters are "ransacking our offices" but says she is primarily concerned about "personal harm." Schumer suggests that Rosen, "in your law enforcement responsibility," persuade Trump to make a "public statement" to tell his supporters "to leave the Capitol."
 3:26p.m.: McCarthy has a phone call with Mayor Bowser and Metro Police Chief Contee conveying that their request was not denied and that Secretary Miller has approved full activation of the DCNG.
 3:32p.m.: Virginia Governor Ralph Northam orders mobilization of Virginia National Guard forces in anticipation of a request for support according to Secretary of Defense timeline. Note inconsistency with statements of Virginia Governor. Statements of Virginia Governor indicate: 1) he authorized all forces under his command to help capitol before DoD, and 2) DoD only followed after dissemination of his mobilization.
 3:36p.m.: White House press secretary Kayleigh McEnany tweets that National Guard and other Federal forces are headed to the Capitol.
 3:37p.m.: Maryland Governor Larry Hogan orders mobilization of Maryland National Guard forces in anticipation of a request for support.
 3:39p.m.: Arlington County, Virginia, acting police chief Andy Penn informs county officials that Arlington officers are responding to the attack and have been absorbed into the Capitol Police response.
 3:39p.m.: Senator Schumer implores Pentagon officials, "Tell POTUS to tweet everyone should leave."  House Majority Leader Steny Hoyer, D–MD, wondered about calling up active duty military.
 3:46p.m.: 
 Leaders from both parties, including Steny Hoyer and Republican leaders Mitch McConnell, Steve Scalise, and John Thune, huddle around a single phone, appealing to the Department of Defense to send troops with a sense of urgency. The person on the other end says they cannot give a timeline for when the Capitol will be secured.
 Chief of the National Guard Bureau Gen. Daniel R. Hokanson has a phone call with Virginia Adjutant General Timothy P. Williams to discuss support to Washington, D.C. and is informed that Virginia National Guard forces have already been mobilized.
 3:48p.m.: Army Secretary McCarthy leaves the Pentagon for Metro Police Department Headquarters in the Henry Daly Building.
 3:55p.m.: Gen. Hokanson has a phone call with Maryland Adjutant General Maj. Gen. Timothy E. Gowen to discuss support to Washington, D.C. and is informed that Maryland National Guard forces have already been mobilized.

4:00p.m. 
 4:03 p.m.: Trump goes outside to the Rose Garden so his staff can make a video of him calling for an end to the violence. He refuses the script they give him.
 4:05p.m.: President-elect Biden holds a press conference calling on President Trump to "demand an end to this siege".
 4:08p.m.: From a secure location, Vice President Pence phoned Christopher Miller, the acting defense secretary, to confirm the Capitol was not secure and ask military leaders for a deadline for securing the building while demanding that the Capitol be cleared.
 4:10p.m.: Army Secretary McCarthy arrives at D.C. Metropolitan Police Department Headquarters.

Trump speaks (4:17 p.m.) 
 4:17p.m.: Trump uploads an unscripted video to his Twitter denouncing the riot but maintaining the false claim that the election was stolen. This was one of three takes, with the "most palatable option" chosen by White House aides for distribution. In the video he says:

I know your pain, I know you're hurt. We had an election that was stolen from us. It was a landslide election and everyone knows it, especially the other side. But you have to go home now. We have to have peace. We have to have law and order. We have to respect our great people in law and order. We don't want anybody hurt. It's a very tough period of time. There's never been a time like this where such a thing happened where they could take it away from all of us — from me, from you, from our country. This was a fraudulent election, but we can't play into the hands of these people. We have to have peace. So go home. We love you. You're very special. You've seen what happens. You see the way others are treated that are so bad and so evil. I know how you feel, but go home, and go home in peace.

Riot continues 
 4:18p.m.: Secretary Miller, Gen. Milley, Army Secretary McCarthy, and Gen. Hokanson discuss availability of National Guard forces located outside of the immediate D.C. Metro area. Secretary Miller verbally authorizes mustering and deployment of out-of-State National Guard forces to D.C.

 4:22p.m.: Pelosi speaks to Pence on the phone about how to move forward with the election certification. She wonders if the Republicans could "confine it to just one complaint, Arizona, and then we could vote and...move forward with the rest of the states." She suspects it may be "days" before it is possible to enter the Capitol again.
 4:26p.m.: Rosanne Boyland, as shown in bodycam video, collapses and is taken to the hospital where she is later pronounced dead of an amphetamine overdose.
 4:32p.m.: Secretary Miller authorizes DCNG to actually deploy in support of the U.S. Capitol Police.
 4:34 p.m.: A White House landline places a call to the cell phone of Anton Lunyk, a rioter who had entered the Capitol an hour earlier. The call lasts nine seconds. (The call was first publicly disclosed in September 2022 and is the only known call between the White House and a rioter that day.)
 4:40p.m.: Army Secretary McCarthy has a phone call with Maryland Governor Hogan in which the Governor agrees to send Maryland NG forces to D.C., expected the next day.

5:00 p.m. 
At some point during the "afternoon", Trump tried to call into Lou Dobbs Tonight, which aired every weekday at 5 p.m., but Fox executives decided it would be "irresponsible" to allow him on the air.
 5:08p.m.: Army senior leaders relay to Major General Walker the Secretary of Defense's permission to deploy the DCNG to the Capitol.
 5:20p.m.: The first contingent of 155 Guard members, dressed in riot gear, began arriving at the Capitol.
 5:40p.m.: 154 DCNG soldiers arrive at the Capitol Complex, swear in with the Capitol Police, and begin support operations, having departed the D.C. Armory at 5:02pm.
 Around 5:40p.m.: As the interior of the Capitol is cleared of rioters, leaders of Congress state that they will continue tallying electoral votes.
 5:45p.m.: Secretary Miller signs formal authorization for out-of-State National Guard to muster and deploy in support of U.S. Capitol Police.

 Around 5:45p.m.: Police announce that Ashli Babbitt, the rioter shot inside the Capitol, has died.
 5:58 p.m.: Pence—calling from the basement of the Capitol, where he is standing with the chief of the U.S. Capitol Police, Steven Sund—talks to Speaker of the House Nancy Pelosi by phone. He says that Sund "just informed me what you will hear through official channels": that the police expect to secure the Capitol soon, and thus Pelosi can expect to hear from Paul Irving, the Sergeant-at-Arms, who is "your point of contact on security in the House", about "the process for reentering" the building so that the leaders can reconvene the House and the Senate in about an hour. Pence says he also plans to speak to Senate Minority Leader Chuck Schumer, and Pelosi passes the phone to him. Pence repeats the message and tells Schumer he wants to give him a "heads up," although Pence said he's already informed the Senate and that Schumer can expect to hear directly from the Sergeant-at-Arms. "I hope that's helpful. I'll let you talk through regular channels", Pence says.

6:00 p.m. 
 6:00p.m.: D.C. curfew comes into effect.
 6:01p.m.: President Trump tweetsThese are the things and events that happen when a sacred landslide election victory is so unceremoniously & viciously stripped away from great patriots who have been badly & unfairly treated for so long. Go home with love & in peace. Remember this day forever! When Twitter reinstated Trump's account in November 2022, this tweet was gone. Trump "knew exactly what he was doing" in making this tweet—the U.S. House select committee on January 6 alleged when criminally referring him for insurrection—especially as a White House staffer had warned him not to tweet it since it would imply his complicity in the Capitol riot, yet "he tweeted it anyway."
 6:09p.m.: Rosanne Boyland is pronounced dead at a local hospital after collapsing near a tunnel entrance on the west side of the Capitol.
 6:14p.m.: U.S. Capitol Police, D.C. Metropolitan Police, and DCNG successfully establish a perimeter on the west side of the U.S. Capitol.
 6:30p.m.: Chief Sund briefs Pence, Pelosi, Schumer and other members of congressional leadership on the security situation, advising that both chambers could reopen by 7:30 p.m.

7:00 p.m. 
 7:00p.m.: Facebook, Inc. removes President Trump's posts from Facebook and Instagram for "contribut[ing] to, rather than diminish[ing], the risk of ongoing violence."
 7:02p.m.: Twitter removes Trump's tweets and suspends his account for twelve hours for "repeated and severe violations of [its] Civic Integrity policy".
 7:13p.m.: Members of Congress return to the Capitol.
 7:59 p.m.: Stephanie Grisham, chief of staff to Melania Trump and former White House press secretary, tweets her resignation, becoming the first official to resign post-attack.

Congress reconvenes (8:00 p.m.) 
 8:00p.m.: U.S. Capitol Police declare the Capitol building to be secure.
 8:06p.m.: The Senate reconvenes, with Vice President Pence presiding, to continue debating the objection to the Arizona electoral count.
 8:31p.m.: The Federal Protective Service issues a memo warning that an armed militia group is reportedly traveling from West Virginia to D.C.
 8:36p.m.: Facebook blocks Trump's page for 24 hours.
 9:00p.m.: Speaker Pelosi reopens the House debate.
 10:00p.m.: Officer Brian Sicknick collapses while still on duty at Capitol building.
 10:15p.m.: The Senate votes 93–6 against the objection raised by a handful of Republican senators against the counting of Arizona's electoral votes.
 11:30p.m.: The House votes 303–121 to reject the Republican objection to the counting of Arizona's electoral votes.

Also

 (time unspecified): A tactical team of the FBI Hostage Rescue Team was one of the first outside federal agencies to enter the Capitol (see "National Mission Force", Jan 3 above)
 (time unspecified): Donald Trump's allies planned for him to give another speech the following day to disavow the violence. Trump rejected several lines from the script and crossed them out. The rejected lines included: "I am directing the Department of Justice to ensure all lawbreakers are prosecuted to the fullest extent of the law. We must send a clear message — not with mercy but with JUSTICE. Legal consequences must be swift and firm. ... I want to be very clear: you do not represent me. You do not represent our movement." Ivanka Trump testified to the House committee: "I'm not sure when those conversations began, because they could have started early the next morning [the 7th], but I believe...they started...the evening of the 6th."

Aftermath

Thursday, January 7, 2021 
 12:15a.m.: Republican Representative Scott Perry (R-PA) and Senator Josh Hawley (R-MO) objected to the counting of Pennsylvania's electoral votes, triggering a two-hour debate in both chambers.
 12:55a.m.: The Senate rejects, 92–7, the objection raised by a handful of Republican senators against the counting of Pennsylvania's electoral votes.
 2:20a.m.: A small number of representatives nearly have a physical confrontation in the House chamber. After Representative Conor Lamb (D-PA) said the attack on the Capitol by the angry pro-Trump mob earlier in the day was "inspired by lies, the same lies you are hearing in this room tonight," Representative Morgan Griffith (R-VA) objected to Lamb's remarks; the objection was rejected by Speaker Pelosi. Several minutes later, members of both parties have a heated verbal discussion in the middle aisle in close proximity, breaking up when Pelosi called for order.
 3:10a.m.: The House rejects, 282–138, the Republican objection against the counting of Pennsylvania's electoral votes.
 3:24a.m.: After all the objections are rejected, Congress completes the counting of the electoral votes, with Biden winning, 306–232; Vice President Pence affirms the election result, formally declaring Biden the winner.
 2:30 p.m.: During a televised press conference, Nancy Pelosi asks for the resignation of the US Capitol Police Chief Steven Sund, adding "I think Mr. Sund … He hasn't even called us since this happened". Sund submits letter of resignation that afternoon with a departure date of January 16. Both Sergeant at Arms are forced to resign as well.
 7:10 p.m.: Shortly after Twitter unlocked Trump's account, Trump released a video statement condemning the violence at the Capitol, saying that "a new administration will be inaugurated" and that his "focus now turns to ensuring a smooth, orderly, and seamless transition of power" to the Biden administration. This was more than 24 hours after his previous speech in the Rose Garden. Fear of being removed from power by the 25th Amendment was one motivation for Trump to seek the "cover" of this speech, according to Cassidy Hutchinson's testimony before the January 6 house committee. He made "multiple stops and starts", requesting Diet Cokes during the recording, in contrast to his usual method of "one or two takes, call it a day", White House chief photographer Shealah Craighead testified to the House committee. While verbally workshopping the speech on camera, Trump had commented as an aside to his staff: "I don't want to say 'The election is over'."
 Around 9:30p.m.: Capitol Police officer Brian D. Sicknick dies after suffering two strokes.

Friday, January 8, 2021
 10:00 a.m.: Chief Sund is notified by the new acting Senate Sergeant at Arms that his departure is to be effective January 8 not January 16 as previously agreed upon.  Yogananda Pittman is sworn in as acting Chief of the US Capitol Police that afternoon.
 President Trump tweets that he will not attend Biden's inauguration ceremony on January 20. This is Trump's last tweet before his permanent ban on Twitter the same day.
 Twitter permanently bans Trump from its platform, citing "the risk of further incitement of violence". (The ban was lifted by Elon Musk on November 11, 2022, after he had gained control over Twitter.)
 Parler, a platform allegedly used to plan the storming, is removed from the Google Play Store after the users on the app allegedly planned further violence at the Capitol.
 FBI assistant director Steven D'Antuono tells reporters that there is no indication that antifa members stormed the Capitol.

Saturday, January 9, 2021
 The flag outside the Capitol building is lowered to half-staff to pay respect to officer Sicknick who died on January 7 after suffering a stroke.
 Citing posts that risked incitement of violence, Apple removes Parler from its App Store, stating Parler's moderation procedures toward violence-inciting speech were insufficient.
 For similar reasons, Amazon Web Services announces it will terminate hosting services for Parler through its cloud servers at 11:59p.m. on January 10; this will result in Parler's complete shutdown, unless the platform can find another hosting service before it is removed from Amazon's servers. Amazon employee group Amazon Employees For Climate Justice had called on the company to terminate web hosting of the platform unless Parler changed its moderation policies, after Amazon reported 98 instances of posts featured on Parler that "clearly encourage and incite violence."

Monday, January 11, 2021
 2:59a.m. (11:59p.m. PST): Parler goes offline after being suspended from Amazon's cloud servers for hosting violent content. 
 The National Guard is authorized to send up to 15,000 troops to Washington as a security measure to safeguard the capitol.
 The FBI bulletin disseminated to the media reports that armed far-right pro-Trump protests were planned at all 50 state capitols and at the United States Capitol from January 17 through January 20, 2021, Joe Biden's Inauguration Day.
 Trump and Pence saw each other at a meeting. According to Pence in his memoir, Trump said he'd "just learned" that Pence's wife and daughter had been at the Capitol during the attack, and he asked how they were. Trump then wondered aloud: "What if we hadn't had the rally? What if they hadn't gone to the Capitol? adding, "It's too terrible to end like this."

Tuesday, January 12, 2021 
 Pence sat for an interview with documentary filmmaker Alex Holder. While on camera, he received an email with information related to the potential use of the 25th Amendment against Trump. Holder's documentary claims the email contained the draft House resolution demanding that Pence invoke the 25th Amendment, but a spokesperson for Pence countered that Pence had already written to Speaker Pelosi rejecting the 25th Amendment option and that, in the film, Pence was receiving confirmation that someone had sent his letter to Pelosi.

Wednesday, January 13, 2021
 President Trump is impeached for an unprecedented second time by the House of Representatives for the high crime of Incitement of Insurrection for "inciting violence against the Government of the United States." The impeachment article mentions his January 2 phone call with Brad Raffensperger.
 The Federal Bureau of Investigation (FBI) sends out a bulletin advising law enforcement agencies to be cautious when arresting suspects involved in the storming, especially of those who were spotted wearing body armor or "other armament" during the incident.

Sunday, January 17, 2021 
 Representative Ralph Norman sends a text message to White House Chief of Staff Mark Meadows asking him to urge Trump to invoke martial law to prevent Biden's inauguration.

Tuesday, January 19, 2021
 The Oregon Republican Party passes a resolution condemning the Republican House members who voted to impeach Trump; this resolution claims there is growing evidence the attack on the Capitol was a "false flag" operation designed to discredit Trump.
 Police take a notebook from Oath Keeper Thomas Caldwell's home. It contains an apparent threat against two Georgia pollworkers (who would later testify in the House committee's fourth public hearing on June 21, 2022).

Wednesday, January 20, 2021 
 In the inauguration of Joe Biden at the United States Capitol, former Vice President Joe Biden is sworn in as the 46th president of the United States. Senator Kamala Harris is sworn in as the 49th vice president of the United States. Numerous members of the DCNG, the NG of surrounding states, Capitol Police, and DC Police guard the closed-off premises.

Wednesday, January 27, 2021 
 The Chief of the Metropolitan Police Department announces that a second officer present at the riot died by suicide. The Chief also mentions that many other officers are suffering from trauma related to the riot.
 Three Oath Keepers are indicted for planning with other Oath Keepers to commit violence at the Capitol on January 6.

Tuesday, February 16, 2021
 The New York Times updates its report about Brian Sicknick being killed with a fire extinguisher, as medical experts say he did not die of blunt force trauma.

Friday, February 19, 2021
 Six additional Oath Keepers are indicted for conspiring to commit violence at the Capitol.

Monday, April 19, 2021
 The Washington D.C. medical examiner's office announced its finding that Capitol Police officer Brian Sicknick had died from a stroke, classifying his death as natural, with Sicknick's autopsy producing neither evidence of internal or external injuries, nor evidence of allergic reaction to chemical irritants.

Notes

References

External links 
 US Capitol stormed, collected news and commentary. BBC News Online.
 Save America rally speeches (video)
 FBI Seeking Information Related to Violent Activity at the U.S Capitol Building —FBI
 How a Presidential Rally Turned Into a Capitol Rampage, New York Times Visual Investigations timeline with photo and video support

timeline
2021 timelines
Articles containing video clips
Political timelines
Riot timelines
United States history timelines